This is a list of regional routes in South Africa.

R101–R120
Route numbers with three digits starting with "R1" are given to sections of road that were formerly part of a national route with a corresponding number, when the national route has since been moved to a new alignment, usually a freeway. So, for example, the R102 number is given to road segments that were formerly part of the N2, and the R114 number is given to road segments that were formerly part of the N14.

R300–R499
Roads with a three-digit route number starting with 3 or 4 are located in the former Cape Province.

R500–R599
Roads with a three-digit route number starting with 5 are located in the former Transvaal Province.

R600–R699
Roads with a three-digit route number starting with 6 are located in KwaZulu-Natal.

R700–R799
Roads with a three-digit route number starting with 7 are located in the Free State.

See also
 National routes (South Africa)#List of routes
 Provincial routes (South Africa)#List of routes

 
South Africa
Regional routes